Diogoa is a genus of flowering plants belonging to the family Olacaceae.

Its native range is Western Central Tropical Africa; found in Cameroon, Congo, Gabon, Nigeria and Zaïre.

The genus name is in honour of Diogo Cão (c. 1450 – c. 1486), a Portuguese explorer.

Known species:

Diogoa retivenia 
Diogoa zenkeri

References

Olacaceae
Santalales genera
Plants described in 1951
Flora of Africa
Flora of Cameroon
Flora of the Republic of the Congo
Flora of Gabon
Flora of Nigeria
Flora of the Democratic Republic of the Congo